Itawis (also Itawit or Tawit as the endonym) is a Northern Philippine language spoken by the Itawis people, closely related to the Gaddang speech found in Isabela and Nueva Vizcaya.  It also has many similarities to the neighboring Ibanag tongue, while remaining quite different from the prevalent Ilocano spoken in the region and the Tagalog-based Filipino national language.

Background 

Itawis is spoken by the Itawis people of Northern Luzon who inhabit the provinces of Cagayan Valley. Their range is from the lower Chico and Matalag rivers. The language is said to have rooted in the town of Tuao. In many towns by these rivers, Itawis are found with the Ibanags, and speak Ibanag as well, as an example of linguistic adaptation. Speakers of Itawis and Ibanag can easily understand each other because of the close relationship of their languages. The Itawis are linguistically and culturally very closely related to the Ibanag.

The Itawis language is classified as a Malayo-Polynesian language, a subset of the Austronesian language superfamily. During the pre-colonial period of the Philippines, words were borrowed from Spanish to stand in place for words that did not exist in the Itawis language.

In the town of Rizal, Cagayan, a language called Malaueg is spoken by a group of people of the same name. It is not yet clear whether Malaueg is a distinct language or not because its proximity to Itawis may possibly make it a dialect of the latter.

Linguistic notes

The Itawit language has a fast, somewhat soft tone. Speakers usually shorten sentences by shortening words; however, shortening every word is not possible. For a non-fluent, non-native, or a beginner learner, all words in a sentence should be said fully and completely. In a gesture of respect, Itawits usually use the name or status of a person at the end of a sentence.

Example: 'Where is the bathroom?' (asking an elderly woman): 

 'auntie' is used in Itawit for an elderly woman or a family friend);  'elder sister' is used in Itawit as a sign of respect.

The Itawit sentence structure is similar to English.

Example: 'Ifan went to get some water from the fridge.' :  :
[stating word] Ifan [] went to get [word that states a place] water from fridge. 
The format is a noun, verb, adjective/place/noun sequence.

If the speaker is referring to a person, who they are referring to is unclear unless the specification word  is used. The Tagalog equivalent would be , both meaning 'that person'. After , the name of the person referred to is used, but in a gesture of respect, the status and name are given.

Interrogative words

When asking a question, Itawits usually start with a person's name or status and then the question itself.

'What':  ( in some dialects)
'When':  (sometimes shortened to )
'Where':  (+)
'Who': 
'Why': 
'How':

Classification

Dialects

Linguists classify Malaueg and Rizal as dialects of the Itawis language.

Phonology

Vowels

Consonants
Gaddang is also one of the Philippine languages which is excluded from - allophony.

Examples 

 
Comparison to Ibanag

References

Tharp, James A. and Mateo C. Natividad. 1976. Itawis-English wordlist with English-Itawis finderlist. New Haven, CT: Human Relations Area Files.

External links
Itawis language word list from the Austronesian Basic Vocabulary Database
Ortograpiya itáwit (2016) by Komisyon ng Wikang Filipino (KWF)

Cagayan Valley languages
Languages of Cagayan
Languages of Apayao